Mahmudabad (also Romanized as Maḩmūdābād) is a village in Howmeh Rural District, in the Central District of Semnan County, Semnan Province, Iran. At the 2006 census, its population was 70, in 19 families.

References 

Populated places in Semnan County